The 2007 Men's World Open Squash Championship is the men's edition of the World Open, which serves as the individual world championship for squash players. The event took place in the Bermuda from 25 November to 1 December 2007. Amr Shabana won his third World Open title, defeating Grégory Gaultier in the final.

Ranking points
In 2007, the points breakdown were as follows:

Seeds

Draws & Results

See also
World Open
2007 Women's World Open Squash Championship
2007 Men's World Team Squash Championships

References

World Squash Championships
W
Squash
21st century in Hamilton, Bermuda
Squash in Bermuda
International sports competitions hosted by Bermuda